The Great Unknown is the third solo studio album by the Matchbox Twenty lead singer Rob Thomas, released on August 21, 2015, through Atlantic Records. Its lead single, "Trust You", premiered on Entertainment Weekly'''s website on May 29, 2015.

 Critical reception The Great Unknown received generally positive reviews from music critics. At Metacritic, which assigns a normalized rating out of 100 to reviews from mainstream critics, the album received an average score of 69 based on 4 reviews. In a positive review, Stephen Thomas Erlewine of AllMusic described the record as, "an album that deliberately side-steps many of Thomas' signature moves while still sounding unmistakably like him." The Boston Globe's Sarah Rodman wrote that on The Great Unknown, the singer continues his career of composing, "catchy melodies, lyrics straightforward in their universality, and crisp production". According to her, "Thomas is either becoming a stronger, more nuanced singer or continuing to learn how to write in a way that more effectively displays the various facets of his voice."

In a more mixed review, Chuck Arnold of Rolling Stone wrote, "Rob Thomas remains a known quantity on his third solo album. While that means there aren't many surprises, the good news is he's still the same consummate pop-rock craftsman who has been making it all sound so smooth for years." Jim Farber of New York Daily News'' was more critical towards the album's composition and lyrics: "The songs offer few individualized lyrical details, and no consistent themes, to pin on a particular person. The arrangements, likewise, have a slick adaptability that makes these songs serviceable cover material for any pop star of the hour."

Track listing

Personnel

 Aidean Abounasseri – acoustic guitar, electric guitar
 Alex Arias – beat box, drum programming, synthesizer
 Yonatan Ayal – drum programming
 Glenn Berger – tenor saxophone
 Ruth Ann-Cunningham – background vocals
 Ryan Dragon – trombone
 Christian Dugas – background vocals
 Sarah Dugas – background vocals
 Laurence Fishburne – background vocals
 Shep Goodman – drum programming, acoustic guitar, bass guitar, keyboards, background vocals
 La Tanya Hall – background vocals
 James Hovorka – trumpet
 Victor Indrizzo – drums, percussion
 Bunny Knutson – choir
 Jason Lader – bass guitar, acoustic guitar, keyboards, modulator, piano, drum programming, synthesizer strings, synthesizer
 Adam MacDougal – keyboards
 Ray Parker Jr. – electric guitar
 Brent Paschke – bass guitar, drum programming, synthesizer
 Tim Pierce – electric guitar
 Ricky Reed – drum programming
 Elijah Samuels – baritone saxophone
 Matt Serletic – bass guitar, bells, choir, Fender Rhodes, horn arrangements, keyboards, organ, percussion, piano, drum programming, string arrangements, synthesizer strings, synthesizer, background vocals
 Ryan Tedder – drums, acoustic guitar, electric guitar, keyboards, drum programming, background vocals
 Rob Thomas – piano, drum programming, shaker, lead vocals, background vocals
 Lee Thornburg – trumpet
 Patrick Woodward – choir
 Lyle Workman – electric guitar
 Noel Zancanella – bass guitar, drums, keyboards, drum programming

Charts

References

External links
 RobThomasMusic.com – Rob Thomas's official website

2015 albums
Rob Thomas (musician) albums
Atlantic Records albums